The following highways are numbered 915:

Canada

Costa Rica
 National Route 915

United States